Dysodia viridatrix is a moth of the family Thyrididae first described by Francis Walker in 1858. It is found in India, Sri Lanka and Vietnam.

The larval food plant is Capparis spinosa.

References

Moths of Asia
Moths described in 1858
Thyrididae